The Swan 39 was designed by Ron Holland and built by Nautor's Swan and first launched in 1978. This model is very much orientated to the IOR rule with a "R" version produced that looks more like a racing rather than a cruiser racing boat.

References

External links
 Nautor Swan
 Ron Holland Design

Sailing yachts
Keelboats
1970s sailboat type designs
Sailboat types built by Nautor Swan
Sailboat type designs by Ron Holland